The Golden Jubilee of Carl XVI Gustaf will be celebrated in 2023 in the Kingdom of Sweden, to mark the 50th anniversary of the accession of King Carl XVI Gustaf on 15 September 1973. He will be the first Swedish king to celebrate a Golden Jubilee. The 500th anniversary of the election of Gustav Vasa as King of Sweden will also marked be during the Jubilee year.

A number of events have been planned to mark the Jubilee in several places across Sweden throughout the year.

Emblem

During the spring of 2022, the Royal Palace launched a competition, aimed at students in graphic design, to come up with a symbol for the Jubilee year. The winner of the competition was Elis Nyström, a student at the Royal University of Technology.

The emblem consists of different geometric shapes. The green stone symbolizes the King's interest in nature, the blue for the Baltic Sea, purple is a common royal color and the red stone is also found in the royal crown. Nyström said that the geometric shapes should also be "associated with confetti, which fits well when we have a celebration ahead of us".

Celebrations

Throughout 2023, the King's 50 years of reign will be celebrated. The celebrations will also see the 500th anniversary of the election of Gustav Vasa as King of Sweden being commemorated.

Jubilee commemorations will begin in January, with a dinner at Stockholm Palace for representatives from all of Sweden's counties. From February to September 2023, the King and Queen will travel throughout the whole of Sweden and visit a number of cities - from Malmö in the south to Luleå in the north.

On 6 June 2023, the 500th anniversary of the election of Gustav Vasa as King of Sweden at the national assembly in Strängnäs, the King and Queen will start the National Day celebrations in Strängnäs and end the day in Stockholm. The National Day celebration at Skansen in Stockholm will be more extensive this Jubilee year. In the evening, the King will host a grand National Day reception for representatives of Sweden and the diplomatic corps at the Nordic Museum.

Celebrations will take place on September 15 and 16 in Stockholm to mark the King's Golden Jubilee. On 15 September the Te Deum will be held in the Royal Palace Church. During the day, the King will oversee a changing of the guard and will receive a singer's tribute at the palace's outer courtyard. The same evening, a dinner will be held in the Rikssalen at King's Hall. On 16 September, the King and Queen will travel in cortege through the capital.

At Gripsholm Castle during the jubilee year, visitors can find out all about Gustav Vasa's life. There will be lectures and tours on the castle, its defence, and the Vasa family.

Exhibitions

During the year, a number of exhibitions will be held at royal residences to mark the Jubilee.

One of the jubilee exhibitions will highlight unique objects that are important to the history of Sweden. The objects reveal how court culture contributed to Sweden’s development and the formation of the country of Sweden as we know it today. This historical journey will encompass the establishment of a Swedish central government, the Age of Greatness, academies, parliamentary power, international influences, art collections, and a commitment to the environment.

This photographic exhibition celebrates 50 years during which The King has served as Swedish Head of State. It includes official portraits. The photographs also show five decades of Sweden as a nation. They also show the continuity that The King has brought in his role as the longest-reigning monarch in Sweden's history.

See also

Golden Jubilee of Elizabeth II
Golden Jubilee of Victoria
Golden Jubilee of Margrethe II

References

2023 in Sweden
Swedish monarchy
Golden jubilees
Events in Sweden